Sacred Heart Hospital, also known as the Floyd Valley Apartments, is an historic building located in Le Mars, Iowa, United States. Construction of the building began in 1921. It was designed by Sioux City architect William Steele and Riesche & Sanborn was the contractor. The five-story brick structure was completed two years later for $350,000. The Sisters of St. Francis from Dubuque operated the hospital for the next 43 years. In addition to the hospital, the building also housed Sacred Heart Nursing School from 1923 to 1938. On December 1, 1966, the City of Le Mars took over the operation of the hospital, which was renamed Floyd Valley Hospital at that time. They continued to use the Sacred Heart building. A capital campaign to build a new facility was begun in 1972, and the present hospital on Iowa Highway 3 was completed in 1976.  This building has subsequently been converted into apartments. It was listed on the National Register of Historic Places in 2010.

References

Hospital buildings completed in 1923
1923 establishments in Iowa
Le Mars, Iowa
Buildings and structures in Plymouth County, Iowa
William L. Steele buildings
Roman Catholic Diocese of Sioux City
National Register of Historic Places in Plymouth County, Iowa
Hospital buildings on the National Register of Historic Places in Iowa